The 2000 Skol World Darts Championship was the seventh World Championship organised by the Professional Darts Corporation (PDC). It was held between 28 December 1999 and 4 January 2000 at the Circus Tavern in Purfleet, Essex.

Phil Taylor beat Dennis Priestley in the final by 7 sets to 3, thus notching up his sixth successive World Championship and his eighth overall. As the tournament is staged earlier in the calendar year than most other World Championships in sport, Sky Sports commentators claimed that Taylor was the "first World Champion of the new millennium". For Priestley, it was the fourth time that he had lost to Taylor in the final in five years.

Eric Bristow's first-round defeat to American Steve Brown virtually signalled the end of the legendary player's career at the top level: this was to be the last time he appeared at a World Championship, having done so in 23 consecutive years stretching back to the inaugural event of 1978. John Lowe thus became the last remaining player with an unbroken appearance record.

Seeds
 Peter Manley 
 Phil Taylor
 Rod Harrington 
 Shayne Burgess 
 Dennis Priestley 
 John Part 
 Alan Warriner 
 Peter Evison

Prize money
The prize fund was £111,000.

Results

Representation from different countries
This table shows the number of players by country in the World Championship. Six countries were represented in the World Championship, one more than in the previous championship.

References

PDC World Darts Championships
PDC World Darts Championship 2000
PDC World Darts Championship 2000
PDC World Darts Championship
PDC World Darts Championship
PDC World Darts Championship
Purfleet
Sport in Essex